Bao'an (Mandarin: 保安镇) is a town in Tongren County, Huangnan Tibetan Autonomous Prefecture, Qinghai, China. In 2010, Bao'an had a total population of 10,771 people: 5,332 males and 5,439 females: 2,441 under 14 years old, 7,396 aged between 15 and 64 and 934 over 65 years old.

References 

Township-level divisions of Qinghai
Huangnan Tibetan Autonomous Prefecture